Paul Herygers (born 22 November 1962) is a retired Belgian cyclo-cross cyclist.

Herygers was born in Herentals, Belgium. In his second year as a professional he was Belgian Champion, beating Danny De Bie in a sprint. The following year he became World Champion in Koksijde, ahead of Richard Groenendaal and his compatriot Erwin Vervecken. In 1997 he became Belgian cyclo-cross champion for the second time.

Herygers is a commentator for cyclo-cross for Sporza and cyclo-cross coordinator of the Belgian cycling association, the KBWB.

Major Results

Cyclo-cross

 1983
 1st Contern Cyclocross
1992
 1st Cyclocross Rijkevorsel
 1st Cyclo-cross Kalmthout
 1st Kasteelcross Zonnebeke
 2nd Duinencross Koksijde
 3rd Cyclocross Ravels
 1993
 1st  National CX Championships
 1st Cyclocross Rijkevorsel
 1st Ziklokross Igorre
 1st Superprestige Gieten
 1st Cyclocross Ravels
 1st Cyclocross Contern
 1st Kasteelcross Zonnebeke
 1st Cyclocross Steinmaur
 1st Vlaamse Aardbeiencross Hoogstraten
 1st Cyclocross Eindhoven
 1st Cyclocross Eschenbach
 1st Krawatencross Lille
1st General Classification GvA Trophy
 2nd Cyclo-cross Kalmthout
 2nd Duinencross Koksijde
 2nd Jaarmarktcross Niel
3rd Azencross Loenhout
3rd GP Essen
 1994
 1st  UCI World CX Championships
 1st Cyclocross Rijkevorsel
 1st Cyclo-cross Kalmthout
 1st Cyclocross Silvelle 
 1st GP Essen
 1st Superprestige Gieten
 1st Duinencross Koksijde
 1st Jaarmarktcross Niel
 1st Kasteelcross Zonnebeke
 1st Cyclocross Steinmaur
 1st Cyclocross Harnes
 1st Krawatencross Lille
1st General Classification UCI World Cup CX
1st General Classification GvA Trophy
 2nd Cyclocross Corva di Azzano
 2nd Vlaamse Aardbeiencross Hoogstraten
3rd Superprestige Diegem
3rd Ziklokross Igorre
 1995
1st Azencross Loenhout
 1st Cyclocross Rijkevorsel
 1st Kasteelcross Zonnebeke
 1st GP Essen
 1st Jaarmarktcross Niel
 1st Contern Cyclocross
 1st Kasteelcross Zonnebeke
 1st Cyclocross Steinmaur
 1st Vlaamse Aardbeiencross Hoogstraten
 1st Sluitingsprijs Oostmalle
 1st Krawatencross Lille
 1st Cyclo-cross Ruddervoorde
 3rd Cyclocross Silvelle 
 3rd Cyclocross Ravels
1st General Classification GvA Trophy
 1996
 1st Cyclocross Rijkevorsel
 1st Kasteelcross Zonnebeke
 1st Vlaamse Aardbeiencross Hoogstraten
 1st Noordzeecross Middelkerke
 1st Kermiscross Ardooie
 1st Sluitingsprijs Oostmalle
 1st Cyclocross Pont-Château
 1st Bredenecross
 1st Nationale Cyclo-Cross Otegem
 1st Cyklokros Tábor
1st General Classification GvA Trophy
 2nd  National CX Championships
 2nd Cyclocross Steinmaur
 2nd GP Essen
 2nd Cyclocross Ravels
 2nd Krawatencross Lille
 1997
 1st  National CX Championships
 1st Noordzeecross Middelkerke
 1st Kermiscross Ardooie
 1st Sluitingsprijs Oostmalle
 1st Surhuisterveen 
1st General Classification GvA Trophy
 2nd Contern Cyclocross
 2nd Cyclocross Steinmaur
3rd Azencross Loenhout
 1998
 1st Kermiscross Ardooie
 2nd Surhuisterveen 
 3rd Noordzeecross Middelkerke

Mountainbike 

 1990
 1st  National Championships Mountainbike
 1991
 1st  National Championships Mountainbike
 1992
 1st  National Championships Mountainbike

Honours and awards 

 Crystal Bicycle – Best Professional Cyclist: 1994
 Honorary Citizen of Koksijde: 1994

References

External links

Belgian male cyclists
Cyclo-cross cyclists
Cycling announcers
1962 births
Living people
People from Herentals
UCI Cyclo-cross World Champions (men)
Cyclists from Antwerp Province
Belgian cyclo-cross champions